The  Tennessee Titans season was the team's 41st season in the National Football League, their 51st overall and their 14th season in Tennessee. The Titans hoped to improve on their 8–8 record from the 2009 season, but they failed to do so and ended up finishing 6-10. They started the season 5-2, but lost the next 8 of 9. This was the Titans’ final season under head coach Jeff Fisher, who resigned on January 27, 2011 after 17 seasons with the team.

Offseason

Personnel changes
On January 25, Kennedy Pola, who previously served as the Jacksonville Jaguars' running backs coach for the past five seasons, was hired to the same position with the Titans, replacing Earnest Byner, who was fired the same day. (Ironically, Byner was later named the new Jaguars' running backs coach ten days later.) On May 14, Ruston Webster, who served as the Seattle Seahawks' vice president of player personnel for the past four seasons, was hired to the same position with the Titans.

On July 27, Kennedy Pola left the Titans and accepted the offensive coordinator position at USC. On July 28, the following changes were made to the Titans' coaching staff: Craig Johnson was moved from quarterbacks coach to the running backs coach vacated by Kennedy Pola, and will also serve as assistant head coach. Dowell Loggains, who previously served as quality control of offense, was named the new quarterbacks coach, while offensive assistant Richie Hessman will serve as quality control of offense.

Free agents

2010 draft class

Coaching staff

Final roster

Schedule

Preseason

The Titans preseason schedule was announced on March 31, 2010.

Regular season

The Titans' regular season schedule was announced on April 20, 2010.

Standings

Regular season results

Week 1: vs. Oakland Raiders

The Titans began their season at home against the Oakland Raiders.  Tennessee trailed early in the first quarter as Raiders kicker Sebastian Janikowski made a 34-yard field goal.  Tennessee answered as quarterback Vince Young hooked up with wide receiver Nate Washington on a 56-yard touchdown pass, followed by kicker Rob Bironas nailing a 43-yard field goal.  The Titans added to their lead in the second quarter with a 15-yard touchdown run from running back Javon Ringer, followed by Chris Johnson's 76-yard touchdown run.

Tennessee continued its dominating day in the third quarter as Johnson got a 4-yard touchdown run.  In the fourth quarter, the Titans wrapped up their performance with Young finding tight end Bo Scaife on a 1-yard touchdown pass.  Afterwards, Oakland ended the game with quarterback Jason Campbell completing a 7-yard touchdown pass to running back Darren McFadden.

With the win, Tennessee began its season at 1–0.

Week 2: vs. Pittsburgh Steelers

Hoping to maintain their winning streak the Titans played on home ground for an AFC duel with the Steelers. In the first quarter the Titans trailed early when WR Antonio Brown returned a kickoff 89 yards to the endzone for a touchdown. The Titans tried to cut the lead with kicker Rob Bironas nailing a 21-yard field goal. In the 2nd quarter the Titans progressively fell further behind with kicker Jeff Reed hitting a 36 and a 34-yard field goal, followed in the fourth quarter by his 25 and 27 yard field goal to go up 19–3. The Titans tried to tie the game when QB Kerry Collins threw a 2-yard TD pass to WR Nate Washington (With the 2-point conversion made), but the Steelers defense prevented any more scoring from the Titans, giving Tennessee the loss.

With the loss, Tennessee fell to 1–1.

Week 3: at New York Giants

Hoping to rebound from their loss to the Steelers, the Titans flew to New Meadowlands Stadium for an interconference duel with the New York Giants. In the first quarter, Tennessee took the early lead when kicker Rob Bironas nailed a 48-yard field goal, followed in the second quarter by running back Chris Johnson getting a 1-yard touchdown run. The Giants replied with kicker Lawrence Tynes nailing a 50-yard field goal, followed by running back Ahmad Bradshaw getting a 10-yard touchdown run to tie the game.

In the third quarter, near the Giants endzone, a Chop Block penalty was enforced on Bradshaw into the endzone for a safety. The Titans started to pull away with quarterback Vince Young completed a 13-yard touchdown pass to wide receiver Kenny Britt, followed in the fourth quarter by Bironas getting a 22-yard field goal. Finally, Johnson closed out the game with an 8-yard touchdown run.

With the win, Tennessee improved to 2–1.

Week 4: vs. Denver Broncos

The Titans' fourth game was an AFC duel with the Broncos at home ground. The Titans trailed early in the 2nd quarter as QB Kyle Orton got a 2-yard TD pass to WR Eddie Royal. They replied with QB Vince Young getting an 8-yard TD pass to WR Kenny Britt. The Broncos' kicker Matt Prater made a 36-yard field goal to give Denver a 3-point lead, but the Titans replied when kicker Rob Bironas nailed an incredible 55-yard field goal. In the 3rd quarter the Titans trailed slightly when Matt Prater made a 36-yard field goal, but after that, WR Marc Mariani returned the kickoff and ran 98 yards to the endzone for a touchdown, giving the Titans the lead. The lead was narrowed when Prater made a 35-yard field goal, but was increased again when Bironas made a 46-yard field goal. In the 4th quarter Tennessee fell behind when QB Kyle Orton completed a 6-yard TD pass to RB Correll Buckhalter, followed by Prater making another 36-yard field goal.

With the loss, the Titans fell to 2–2.

Week 5: at Dallas Cowboys

Hoping to rebound from their home loss to the Broncos, the Titans flew to Cowboys Stadium for a Week 5 interconference duel with the Dallas Cowboys.  Tennessee delivered the opening punch in the first quarter as quarterback Vince Young completed a 24-yard touchdown pass to wide receiver Nate Washington, followed by kicker Rob Bironas making a 52-yard field goal.  Afterwards, the Cowboys answered with kicker David Buehler getting a 51-field goal.  In the second quarter, the Titans added to their lead as Young connected with wide receiver Kenny Britt on a 12-yard touchdown pass.  Dallas came right back with quarterback Tony Romo completing a 6-yard touchdown pass to wide receiver Roy Williams.

The Cowboys tied the game in the third quarter as Romo threw a 69-yard touchdown pass to wide receiver Miles Austin, yet Tennessee regained the lead as Bironas booted a 40-yard field goal.  In the fourth quarter, Dallas caught up again as Buehler kicked a 26-yard field goal.  Afterwards, the Titans struck back as running back Chris Johnson got a 1-yard touchdown run.  However, the Cowboys tied the game again as Romo connected with tight end Jason Witten on an 18-yard touchdown pass.  Fortunately, Tennessee came right back as Johnson got another 1-yard touchdown run.

With the win, the Titans improved to 3–2.

Week 6: at Jacksonville Jaguars

Coming off their road win over the Cowboys, the Titans flew to EverBank Field for a Week 6 AFC South duel with the Jacksonville Jaguars on Monday night.  Tennessee delivered the opening strike in the first quarter as quarterback Vince Young found wide receiver Kenny Britt on a 24-yard touchdown pass.  In the second quarter, the Titans added onto their lead as quarterback Kerry Collins hooked up with tight end Bo Scaife on a 2-yard touchdown pass, followed by kicker Rob Bironas booting a 26-yard field goal.

Tennessee continued its dominating night in the third quarter as Bironas nailed a 33-yard field goal.  The Jaguars finally answered with a 33-yard field goal from kicker Josh Scobee.  The Titans pulled away in the fourth quarter as Bironas booted a 36-yard field goal, capped off by a 35-yard touchdown run from running back Chris Johnson.

With the win, Tennessee improved to 4–2.

Week 7: vs. Philadelphia Eagles

Hoping to increase their winning streak the Titans played on home ground for an Interconference duel with the Eagles. In the second quarter the Titans trailed with kicker David Akers making a 25-yard field goal. But they put themselves ahead with QB Kerry Collins completing a 26-yard TD pass to WR Kenny Britt. The Eagles replied with QB Kevin Kolb making a 5-yard TD pass to WR Riley Cooper, followed by kicker David Akers hitting a 46-yard field goal. In the third quarter the Titans fell further behind with Akers making a 46-yard field goal. They soon replied with kicker Rob Bironas nailing a 41-yard field goal, but the Eagles continued to score in the 4th with Akers getting a 28-yard field goal. Eventually, they rallied to take a big lead with Collins completing an 80-yard TD pass to Britt, followed by Bironas hitting a 38-yard field goal. Then Collins found Britt for the third time in the game on a 16-yard TD pass, and then Bironas made a 33-yard field goal. The Titans continued to get their momentum going with CB Cortland Finnegan returning an interception 41 yards for a touchdown.

With the win, the Titans improved to 5–2.

Week 8: at San Diego Chargers

Hoping to increase their current winning streak the Titans flew to Qualcomm Stadium for an AFC duel with the Chargers. In the first quarter the Titans took the lead when the Chargers' punt was blocked by Nick Schommer out of bounds for a safety. The Chargers replied with FB Mike Tolbert getting a 1-yard TD run. The Titans went on a scoring rally with kicker Rob Bironas nailing a 21-yard field goal, followed in the second quarter by QB Vince Young completing a 1-yard TD pass to TE Craig Stevens. They increased their lead with RB Chris Johnson getting a 29-yard TD run. The Chargers went on a scoring rally with RB Ryan Mathews making a 7-yard TD run, followed in the third quarter by kicker Kris Brown making a 34-yard field goal. Then QB Philip Rivers completed a 48-yard TD pass to TE Antonio Gates, and then Brown made a 36-yard field goal. The Titans tried to come back with Young finding WR Nate Washington on a 71-yard TD pass (with a failed 2-point conversion), but couldn't do anything after Rivers got a 13-yard TD pass to RB Darren Sproles.

With the loss, the Titans fell to 5–3.

Week 9: BYE

Week 10: at Miami Dolphins

Coming off their bye week the Titans flew to Sun Life Stadium for an AFC duel with the Dolphins. In the first quarter the Titans trailed early as RB Ronnie Brown got a 2-yard TD run. They replied with RB Chris Johnson getting a 17-yard TD run. They took the lead after kicker Rob Bironas nailed a 40-yard field goal. They fell behind after kicker Dan Carpenter made a 23 and a 26-yard field goal, which was soon followed by QB Chad Henne completing a 13-yard TD pass to RB Patrick Cobbs. The Titans replied with QB Vince Young completing a 14-yard TD pass to WR Nate Washington, but fell further behind after Carpenter got a 42-yard field goal, followed by QB Tyler Thigpen making a 9-yard TD pass to TE Anthony Fasano (With a failed 2-point conversion). Then DB Reshad Jones tackled in the end zone for a Dolphins safety.

With the loss, the Titans fell to 5–4.

Week 11: vs. Washington Redskins

Hoping to break their current losing streak the Titans played on home ground for an AFC duel with the Redskins. In the first quarter the Titans took a sudden lead with WR Marc Mariani returning a punt 87 yards for a touchdown. The Redskins replied with QB Donovan McNabb completing a 5-yard TD pass to WR Santana Moss, followed in the second quarter by kicker Graham Gano nailing a 19-yard field goal. The Titans got the lead back after kicker Rob Bironas made a 25 and a 32-yard field goal. However, the Redskins replied with Gano hitting a 40-yard field goal. The Titans scored with Bironas nailing a 40-yard field goal, but the Redskins replied again with Gano making a 42-yard field goal. The decision was made at Overtime after Gano successfully hit a 48-yard field goal to give the Titans the loss, settling the records for both teams at 5–5 and the Titans' 14-game winning streak against NFC Opponents was snapped.

During the game, Vince Young suffered a torn flexor tendon in his right thumb.  He was replaced by Rusty Smith.  Young was held out of the game after he was prepared to reenter. Following the game, Young threw his shoulder pads into the crowd as he left the field, had an altercation with Coach Fisher in the locker room, and stormed out. Fisher then declared that Smith was the Titans' starting quarterback.

Week 12: at Houston Texans

In an attempt to break a three-game losing streak the Titans flew to Reliant Stadium for an AFC South rivalry match against the Texans. The Titans trailed throughout the game as QB Matt Schaub got a 1-yard TD pass to TE Joel Dreessen, followed by his 2-yard TD pass to WR Andre Johnson. The lead was increased when kicker Neil Rackers hit a 35 and a 33-yard field goal.

With 7:53 remaining in the 4th quarter, an altercation between Texans WR Andre Johnson and Titans CB Cortland Finnegan broke out, causing both players to be ejected for the rest of the game. Both players' helmets were torn off, then punches were exchanged in return. Despite being ejected, they avoided suspension, but were each fined $25,000 for their actions.

With the shut-out loss, not only did the Titans fall to 5–6, but this also became their 3rd straight season being shut out on the road.

Week 13: vs. Jacksonville Jaguars

Hoping to snap a four-game losing streak the Titans played on home ground for an AFC South rivalry match against the Jaguars. In the first quarter the Titans trailed early as RB Rashad Jennings got an 11-yard TD run. This was followed in the second quarter by QB David Garrard scrambling 4 yards for a touchdown, and then with kicker Josh Scobee making a 26-yard field goal. The Titans tried to cut this lead but only came away with a 37 and a 30-yard field goal from Rob Bironas giving them a loss.

With the loss, the Titans fell to 5–7.

Week 14: vs. Indianapolis Colts

Hoping to snap a five-game losing streak, the Titans stayed at home for a Week 14 AFC South duel with the Indianapolis Colts on Thursday night.  Tennessee trailed in the first quarter as Colts running back Javarris James got a 1-yard touchdown run.  Indianapolis added onto their lead in the second quarter with quarterback Peyton Manning completing a 1-yard and a 19-yard touchdown pass to wide receiver Pierre Garçon.  The Titans answered with a 1-yard touchdown run from running back Chris Johnson.

Tennessee slowly crept back into the game in the third quarter as quarterback Kerry Collins found tight end Craig Stevens on a 7-yard touchdown pass, yet the Colts responded with kicker Adam Vinatieri making a 21-yard field goal.  Indianapolis added onto their lead in the fourth quarter with Vinatieri booting a 28-yard field goal.  The Titans tried to rally as Collins connected with tight end Bo Scaife on a 4-yard touchdown pass, but the Colts came right back with Vinatieri's 47-yard field goal.  Tennessee closed out the game with Collins finding Scaife on a 2-yard touchdown pass.

With the loss, the Titans fell to 5–8.

Week 15: vs. Houston Texans

Hoping to snap a six-game losing streak the Titans played on home ground for an AFC South rivalry rematch against the Texans. The Titans took the lead after QB Kerry Collins threw a 3 and a 1-yard TD pass to WR Nate Washington and to WR Justin Gage. This was followed by RB Chris Johnson getting an 11-yard TD run. The Texans got on the scoreboard after kicker Neil Rackers made a 37-yard field goal, but the Titans extended their lead after kicker Rob Bironas hit a 30-yard field goal. The lead was narrowed with QB Matt Schaub getting a 12-yard TD pass to WR Andre Johnson, but the Titans pulled away with RB Javon Ringer getting a 7-yard touchdown run. The lead was narrowed again with Schaub throwing a 4-yard TD pass to WR Kevin Walter, but the Titans' defense prevented any more scoring chances.

With the win, the Titans improved to 6–8.

Week 16: at Kansas City Chiefs

Coming off their win over the Texans the Titans flew to Arrowhead Stadium for an AFC duel with the Chiefs. In the first quarter the Titans trailed early as QB Matt Cassel threw a 14 and a 5-yard TD pass to RB Jamaal Charles. This was followed by kicker Ryan Succop nailing a 35-yard field goal, then with Cassel making a 75-yard TD pass to WR Dwayne Bowe. They tried to come back as QB Kerry Collins got a 53-yard TD pass to WR Kenny Britt, but had more problems as Collins' next pass was intercepted by SS Eric Berry and returned 54 yards for a touchdown. This was followed by Succop making a 42-yard field goal. The Titans tried to come back, but came away only with Collins completing a 22-yard TD pass to TE Jared Cook, which wasn't enough for a win.

With the loss, the Titans fell to 6–9 and a guarantee of their first losing season since 2005.

Week 17: at Indianapolis Colts

The Titans' final game was an AFC South rivalry rematch against the Colts. In the first quarter the Titans trailed early as kicker Adam Vinatieri made a 48-yard field goal, but they responded as kicker Rob Bironas nailed a 26-yard field goal. The Colts scored again with Vinatieri making a 44-yard field goal, but the Titans re-tied the game with Bironas hitting a 42-yard field goal. The Colts tried to pull away with QB Peyton Manning completing a 7-yard TD pass to WR Reggie Wayne, but the Titans kept the score level as QB Kerry Collins made a 30-yard TD pass to WR Kenny Britt. The Colts still tried to pull away with Manning completing a 30-yard TD pass to WR Pierre Garçon, but the Titans re-tied the game for the fourth time as Collins threw a 15-yard TD pass to RB Chris Johnson. The Colts got away in the fourth quarter as Vinatieri got a 43-yard field goal, giving the Titans a loss and thus ending their season with a 6–10 record.

Notes and references

Tennessee
Tennessee Titans seasons
Titans